Mokhovaya Street is a street in the city of Saint Petersburg, Russia. The street has high socio-cultural value due to numerous historical buildings and monuments of the 18th-20th centuries.

Etymology 
It was granted the status of a city street in 1757, and the name Mokhovaya became official in 1826.

History 
In the early 18th century the territory of modern Mokhovaya street was swampland and covered by forest. The land was drained and cultivated to allow the construction of the first city Wharf. Soon the Chamovnicheskian sloboda was established here. Originally inhabited by weavers, with time it grew and was inhabited by soldiers, officers, Court cooks, beer and kvas brewers. Also, the first city builders lived here, from clerks to architects and employees of the Royal City and Garden Construction Bureau.

By the late 18th century the social strata of local inhabitants changed to more wealthy citizens like prosperous merchants and even some noblemen, such as the Stroganovs, the Skvaronskys, the Vorontsovs, etc. In 1834 the historian  called the Liteyny district (that includes Mokhovaya street) "the tsardom of a most exquisite circle, inhabited by creme de la creme of modern high society". The central, but quiet and cozy street attracted many literary and scientific figures, who rented apartments here.

Until the mid 19th century the street still had some small wooden houses (1-2 storeys high), the pavements were also made of wood and sided by the shallow drains. Water pipes were installed in the 1840-1860s, the carriageway was cobbled in the mid 18th century. Every household was in charge of the street section next to its house. In the 1830s the cobbles were replaced by timber blocks, which significantly reduced the noise from horse carriages. The asphalt covering of the road was made in the 1930s.

In the mid 19th century the city government prohibited construction of wooden buildings facing the main streets, so the look of the street began to change. Many prominent architects like Ippolit Monighetti, Victor Schröter, Leon Benois, and Fyodor Lidval constructed impressive private mansions and revenue houses on Mokhovaya Street for noble families, such as the Obolenskys, the Tolstoys, the Grabbes, the Dashkovs, etc. Most of them were built in the end of 19th - beginning of the 20th century.

The street remained largely unchanged during the Soviet period. Only four houses were constructed after the Russian Revolution in 1917, two buildings were topped with additional floors, but mainly the reconstructions spared the original appearance. In World War II a German bomb destroyed house No.23/10. The rest of the buildings were damaged mostly by improper usage. The restoration lasted for nearly a decade, from the mid 1940s to the mid 1950s. In that period the central heating was changed from stove to steam, so the wood sheds in the courtyards were replaced by new stone house wings, children's playgrounds, and auxiliary buildings.

Historical buildings and monuments 

 No.3 — the nineteenth century mansion of Russian diplomat . From 1857 the writer Ivan Goncharov rented an apartment on the first floor.
 No.10 — the nineteenth century mansion was bought by Count Illarion Vorontsov-Dashkov in the early 1910s. In 1913-1914 Ivan Fomin reconstructed the interiors in Neoclassical style.
A building existed on this site as early as in 1748, it was expanded with court wings in the 1870s by Pavel Suzor.
It was later rented by a women's private preparatory school. It was replaced in 1897–1898 by two modern revenue houses built by architect Leon Benois.
After the Russian revolution, in 1922 the building was given to the Bryantsev Youth Theatre, then in 1962 - to the Russian State Institute of Performing Arts.
Count  was a scientist and major philanthropist. He established his private school in 1898 and in 1900 moved it into the house built for it on Mokhovaya Street by engineer . The school became one of the most respectable in the city. Among its graduates were Osip Mandelstam, Vladimir Nabokov, Vladimir Pozner and others.
It replaced the wooden church of St Michael (1712–1714), built by order of Peter the Great in celebration of his daughter Anna's birthday.

References

Sources

Streets in Saint Petersburg
Tsentralny District, Saint Petersburg